Amhara Province (Amharic: አማራ) also known as Bete Amhara (Ge’ez: ቤተ ዐምሐራ, "House of Amhara") was the name of a medieval province of the Ethiopian Empire, located in present-day Amhara Region, specifically, the modern provinces Semien Shewa and Debub Wollo. It was named after the Amhara people, who originated from the province. Following the Italian conquest of Ethiopia in 1936, "Amhara" (or Italian "Amara") was used to designate the subdivision of Italian East Africa with its administrative center at Gondar, and later the Amhara region would be formed with its capitol in Bahir Dar. The people of this region mainly practice Orthodox Christianity and some practiced Islam (Sunni).

See also
Amhara Region
Amhara people

References

Amhara Region